The Last Hit Man is a 2008 direct-to-video crime thriller film directed by Christopher Warre Smets. It tells the story of an aging contract killer who finds himself in crisis between his daughter and his job after an assignment gone awry.

The film won the award for Best Feature Film at the 2008 Canadian Film Festival.

Synopsis
After he botches a hit, an aging hitman (Joe Mantegna) discovers that he's dying and decides to hide the truth from his daughter, who's also his business partner and getaway driver. When a younger hit man is sent to clean up the mess, he ends up impacting their lives in more ways than initially intended.

Cast
 Joe Mantegna as Harry Tremayne - Father/Hitman
 Elizabeth Whitmere as Racquel Tremayne/Getaway Driver
 Romano Orzari as Billy Rosco/Hitman
 Michael Majeski as Todd/Boyfriend
 William Colgate as Fred Armitage/Harry's boss
 Shawn Lawrence as Fuller/Top boss
 Victoria Snow as Dr. Marion Mornamore
 Maya Ritter as Young Racquel
 Jonnie Chase as Strode/Hired Billy
 Sean Orr as Nicholston/Harry's missed hit

Trivia
 Phil Elverum of The Microphones and Mount Eerie recorded an "[i]mprovised pump organ and electric guitar" soundtrack for this movie in late 2005.
 The film was dedicated in memory of Patricia Ragozzino (1948 - 2006).

References

External links
 

2008 films
2008 direct-to-video films
2008 crime thriller films
2008 action thriller films
Canadian crime thriller films
Canadian action thriller films
English-language Canadian films
Films about contract killing
Canadian direct-to-video films
2000s English-language films
2000s Canadian films